White sea catfish is a common name for several fishes and may refer to:

Galeichthys feliceps, native to southern Africa
Genidens barbus, native to the Rio de la Plata Basin and adjacent ocean